Danderoo is a rural locality in the Southern Downs Region, Queensland, Australia.

Geography 
The predominant land use is for crops with small areas of grazing on native vegetation.

History 
The name Danderoo is believed to be an Aboriginal word, meaning a place of killing, possibly referring to a clash between Aboriginal people and shepherds on Toolburra pastoral run in the 1840s.

Danderoo State School opened on 22 January 1900 and closed on 1964.

Education 
There are no schools in Danderoo. The nearest primary school is Yangan State School in Yangan to the north. The nearest secondary school is Killarney State School (to Year 10) in Killarney to the south-east and Warwick State High School (to Year 12) in Warwick to the west.

References

Further reading 

 

Southern Downs Region
Localities in Queensland